John Jones House may refer to:

John James Jones House, Waynesboro, Georgia, listed on the National Register of Historic Places (NRHP) in Burke County
John Carroll Jones House, Natchez, Louisiana, listed on the NRHP in Natchitoches Parish
John Jones House (Stoneham, Massachusetts), NRHP-listed
John Paul Jones House, Portsmouth, New Hampshire, NRHP-listed
John W. Jones House, Elmira, New York, NRHP-listed
John Jones Homestead, Van Cortlandtville, New York, NRHP-listed
John J. Jones House, Madison, Ohio, listed on the NRHP in Lake County
John H. Jones House, Janesville, Wisconsin, listed on the NRHP in Rock County

See also
Jones House (disambiguation)